The Voice of Nigeria or VON is the official international broadcasting station of Nigeria.

History
Founded in 1961, the Voice of Nigeria began life as the External Service of the then Nigerian Broadcasting Corporation (now Federal Radio Corporation of Nigeria). Then Prime Minister Sir Abubakar Tafawa Balewa commissioned the service.

The nation's growing commitment informed the need to have an external channel through which authoritative information about the African situation could be disseminated to the entire world. Even then, its transmission, using a 10 kW HF transmitter, was limited to West Africa for two hours daily in English and French. Broadcast hours increased to six in 1963 with the commissioning of five prototype RCA 100 kW transmitters.

In 1989, five Brown Boveri transmitters with antennae system were acquired. On January 5, 1990, VON became autonomous, and in 1996, three state-of-the-art 250 kW Thomcast AG transmitters were commissioned. This boosted VON's transmission to the entire world. The transmitting station is located on 40 hectares at Ipokodo, Ikorodu in Lagos State. While the administrative headquarters is in Abuja, the Federal Capital, News and Programmes emanate from both the Lagos and Abuja studios. In 2012, VON commissioned another state of the art multi-billion naira transmitting station at Lugbe, Abuja.

Powers and functions

According to the Act establishing Voice of Nigeria (VON), the following are some of its powers and functions
The Corporation shall, to the exclusion of any other broadcasting authority or any other body in Nigeria, be responsible for broadcasting externally, by radio, Nigeria's viewpoint to any part of the world.
(1) Provide as a public service, in the interest of Nigeria, radio broadcasting services for global reception in such languages and at such time as the Corporation may specify; 
(2) The Corporation shall ensure that its services reflect views of Nigeria as a Federation and give adequate expression to the culture, characteristics, affairs and opinions of Nigeria. 
(3) The Corporation shall ensure that news and programmes enhance Nigeria's foreign policy and image.

Vision
“To become the international radio broadcasting station of first choice for anyone interested in Nigeria and Africa”.

Mission
“Reflecting Nigerian and African perspective in our broadcast, winning and sustaining the attention, respect and goodwill of listeners worldwide particularly Nigerians and Africans in the Diaspora and making Nigeria’s voice to be heard more positively in the shaping of our world”.

See also 
 Federal Radio Corporation of Nigeria, the Nigerian publicly funded radio broadcaster

References

External links
 Voice of Nigeria Website

International broadcasters
Radio stations in Nigeria
Radio stations established in 1961
State media